Plas Newydd may refer to:

Plas Newydd (Anglesey), a historic house and garden on Anglesey, Wales, United Kingdom
Plas Newydd, Llangollen, a historic house and garden in Llangollen, Denbighshire, Wales, United Kingdom

See also
 Plasnewydd, a neighbourhood in Cardiff.